The 2023 San Jose State Spartans football team will represent San Jose State University in the Mountain West Conference during the 2023 NCAA Division I FBS football season. The Spartans are expected to be led by Brent Brennan in his seventh year as head coach. They play their home games at CEFCU Stadium in San Jose, California.

Previous season 

The Spartans finished the 2022 season with a 7–5 record and a loss in the Famous Idaho Potato Bowl to Eastern Michigan, 41–27. They had their game against New Mexico State postponed (then later cancelled) due to the death of football player Camdan McWright.

Offseason

Transfers

Outgoing

Incoming

Schedule

Game summaries

at USC

Oregon State

Cal Poly

at Toledo

Air Force

at Boise State

at New Mexico

Coaching staff

References

San Jose State
San Jose State Spartans football seasons
San Jose State Spartans football